Windsor Locks is a town in Hartford County, Connecticut, United States. As of the 2020 census, its population was 12,613. It is the site of Bradley International Airport, which serves the Greater Hartford-Springfield region and occupies approximately 1/3 of the town. Windsor Locks is also the site of the New England Air Museum.

Located beside the Connecticut River and equidistant from the densely populated cities of Springfield, Massachusetts and Hartford, Connecticut, Windsor Locks is named for a set of canal locks that opened in 1829. Windsor Locks is situated just south of the first large falls in the Connecticut River, the Enfield Falls, which is the head of navigation (the farthest point that seagoing vessels can reach) of the Connecticut River. The Enfield Falls Canal circumvents the Enfield Falls and its nearby shallows.

History
Originally part of Windsor, Windsor Locks broke off into its own settlement in 1854 after the thriving Enfield Locks going around Enfield Falls which opened in 1829. The Bradley International Airport opened as a military base in 1940, and opened to civilian use in 1947. In 1967 the town boundary was somewhat altered due to the opening of the Bradley Connector. The town boundary between Windsor Locks and Windsor changed several times and was altered with Windsor Locks being on the westbound side and the Windsor side on the eastbound side with the border on the median.

The 1965 Little League World Series winning team is from Windsor Locks.

Geography

Climate

Windsor Locks has a humid continental climate with hot and humid summer days to cold sometimes frigid winter nights. Average January temperature high is 36 °F (2.2 °C) and a low of 18 °F (−7.8 °C) temps can reach zero degrees or below 4 nights a year. Summer in Windsor Locks can be hot with the average July temperature of 87 °F (30.6 °C) at daytime and 63 °F (17.2 °C) at nighttime. Temperatures at or above 90 can occur 15 to 25 days per year. The hottest temperature at Windsor Locks was 103 °F (39.4 °C) on July 22, 2011, and the coldest recorded temperature was −26 °F (−32 °C) on January 22, 1961. Average rainfall in Windsor Locks is 46.27 inches.

Demographics

As of the census of 2000, there were 12,043 people, 4,935 households, and 3,306 families residing in the town. There were 5,101 housing units at an average density of 218.1 persons/km (565.0 persons/sq mi). The racial makeup of the town was 92.47% White, 2.67% African American, 0.12% Native American, 2.57% Asian, 0.00% Pacific Islander, 0.75% from other races, and 1.42% from two or more races.  2.22% of the population were Hispanic or Latino of any race.

There were 4,935 households, out of which 29.3% had children under the age of 18 living with them, 50.9% were married couples living together, 11.7% had a woman whose husband does not live with her, and 33.0% were non-families. 27.0% of all households were made up of individuals, and 11.3% had someone living alone who was 65 years of age or older.  The average household size was 2.43 and the average family size was 2.97.

In the town, the population was spread out, with 23.7% under the age of 18, 6.2% from 18 to 24, 31.2% from 25 to 44, 22.5% from 45 to 64, and 16.5% who were 65 years of age or older.  The median age was 39 years.  For every 100 females, there were 94.2 males.  For every 100 females age 18 and over, there were 92.1 males.

The median income for a household in the town was $48,837, and the median income for a family was $59,054. Males had a median income of $41,179 versus $33,641 for females. The per capita income for the town was $23,079.  4.4% of the population and 3.3% of families were below the poverty line.  Out of the total people living in poverty, 4.5% were under the age of 18 and 4.7% were 65 or older.

Economy

Until 2000, Windsor Locks was home to the oldest corporation listed on the New York Stock Exchange, the Dexter Corporation. Established in 1767 as C.H. Dexter and Sons, the company grew from a family-owned saw and grist mill and evolved into a multi-national producer of long fiber papers and chemical laminates. In its 233 years of operation, the company grew from manufacturing tissues, toilet paper, and tea bags to marketing more specialized products like medical garments and industrial finishes. Faced with a proposed buyout by International Specialty Products Incorporated in 2000, the Dexter Corporation separated its three divisions and sold them off to avoid a hostile takeover.

The Life Sciences division merged with Invitrogen Corporation. The Specialty Polymers division was sold in part to AkzoNobel, and the remaining businesses merged with Loctite Corporation. The third division, Dexter Nonwoven Materials, located on the company's original site in Windsor Locks, was sold to the Finnish Ahlstrom Paper Group. The physical plant continues to operate, with offices located nearby at 2 Elm Street. In 2011, the Home and Personal Nonwovens division of Ahlstrom Windsor Locks was sold to Suominen Corporation, also headquartered in Finland.

In 1952 Hamilton Standard opened its aircraft propeller plant in Windsor Locks. In 1999, Hamilton Standard merged with Sundstrand Corporation to become Hamilton Sundstrand, which is headquartered in Windsor Locks. Hamilton Sundstrand changed names to UTC Aerospace Systems before acquiring Rockwell Collins and forming Collins Aerospace in 2018.

On 19 September 2008, the Federal Reserve Bank of Boston ceased operations at Windsor Locks and moved them to the Federal Reserve Bank of Philadelphia.

Education

Primary and secondary education falls under the oversight of Windsor Locks Public Schools. Windsor Locks contains five public schools for students in grades Pre-K3 to 12th grade and one transition academy for students age 18–21. 

 North Street Elementary School: Pre-K3–2nd 
 South Street Elementary School: 3rd–5th
 Windsor Locks Middle School: 6th–8th
 Windsor Locks High School (traditional): 9–12
 Pine Meadow Academy (alternative, Big Picture Learning Affiliate School): 9–12
 Rise Transition Academy: transition program from ages 18–21

Historical places

The following places in Windsor Locks are on the National Register of Historic Places.
 David Pinney House and Barn – 58 West St. (added August 25, 1977)
 Enfield Falls Canal – along Connecticut River from Windsor Locks north to Suffield CT at a location directly across the Connecticut River from Thompsonville (added May 22, 1976)
 J. R. Montgomery Company Industrial Complex – 25 Canal Bank Rd. (added December 31, 2017)
 Memorial Hall – Intersection of South Main and Elm streets (added July 2, 1987)
 Windsor Locks Passenger Station – Main Street (added October 2, 1975)

Notable people

 John A. Chapman (1965–2002), US Air Force Combat Controller, posthumously awarded the Medal of Honor
 Ella Grasso, 83rd Governor of Connecticut
 Henry Molaison (1926–2008), American (world-famous) patient who suffered from life-threatening epilepsy and therefore got his medial temporal lobe surgically removed and as a tragic consequence of this life-saving treatment had lost his ability to remember things he recently had learned: his ability to transfer information from short-term memory to long-term memory had been lost
 Kathryn Morris, American actress, best known for her lead role as Detective Lilly Rush in the CBS series Cold Case

See also

 Bradley International Airport
 Windsor Locks (Amtrak station)
 New England Air Museum
 FlightSimCon

References

Further reading

C.H. Dexter Company Records archived at University of Connecticut

External links

 Town of Windsor Locks official website

 
Towns in Hartford County, Connecticut
Connecticut populated places on the Connecticut River
Towns in Connecticut
Springfield metropolitan area, Massachusetts
Greater Hartford